The Lincoln MKZ, is a four-door, five-passenger mid-size luxury sedan manufactured by Ford and marketed as the Zephyr (MY 2006) and as the MKZ (MY 2007–2020) by Ford's Lincoln brand across two generations in both gasoline and hybrid gas/electric models.

The MKZ was manufactured at Ford's Hermosillo Stamping & Assembly plant in Mexico. Production ended in 2020 to make way for new Ford vehicles.

First generation (2006–2012)

The 2006 Lincoln Zephyr was initially unveiled in concept form at the 2004 New York International Auto Show, previewing a new entry-level luxury sedan. The front featured Lincoln's signature waterfall grille and jeweled quad projector beam headlights (HID headlights were available). Chrome trim extends along the Zephyr's beltline while the car's rear fascia features LED taillights and dual chrome exhaust tips. All Zephyrs featured low-profile tires on 17x7.5-inch wheels with painted aluminum versions standard and chrome versions optional.

Lincoln officially revived the Zephyr name in the fall of 2005; the vehicles were based on the CD3 platform, which was derived from the Mazda 6. Lincoln had previously used the Zephyr name in the late 1930s for the smaller Lincoln-Zephyr line of mid-size vehicles.  The "Zephyr" name had also previously been used by Mercury during the late 1970s and early 1980s, for several vehicles built on the Fox Platform.

The Zephyr's sole powertrain was a 3.0 L DOHC Duratec V6 mated to an Aisin 6-speed automatic transmission; identical to the V6 powertrain that was optional in the Fusion and Milan. The interior is largely unique to the Lincoln, along with different equipment packaging. The 2006 Zephyr started at a base MSRP of $28,995 USD, ranging up to $35,340 USD when fully optioned.

Though slightly smaller and front-wheel drive, the Zephyr was marketed as a replacement for Lincoln's previous entry level mid-size, the rear-wheel drive Lincoln LS. To facilitate a smooth transition, the Zephyr and LS were sold parallel to each other during the 2006 model year, the first model year of the Zephyr and the last for the LS. For 2007 the model was renamed MKZ, and took over the LS' market with sales beginning in September 2006. Lincoln's decision to resurrect the Zephyr name refers to the very early days of Lincoln before World War II. At that time, the only Lincoln manufactured was the Lincoln K-series which was a full-size sedan, and Lincoln, under the direction of Edsel Ford, Henry Ford's only son, hoped to introduce a smaller product to compete with the Packard One-Twenty, and the LaSalle, a smaller sibling offered at Cadillac dealerships.

The Zephyr featured a revised interior from the Fusion and Milan. The design featured shapes with real ebony or maple wood inserts (depending on desired trim) in metallic frames. These surfaces were contrasted with chrome-bezeled gauges, circular, chrome-finished vents and a metallic center stack where the radio and climate controls are housed. The Zephyr's steering wheel was leather-wrapped with real wood grips and satin-nickel audio, climate, and cruise control buttons. White LED backlighting was used for the Zephyr's controls and instrumentation. Leather seating surfaces were standard in all models.

Some of these standard features in the Zephyr included: cruise control, automatic headlights, fog lights, power door locks, "global" power windows (all windows can lower simultaneously at the push of a button), power adjustable and heated mirrors with puddle lamps, remote keyless entry, a tilt and telescoping steering wheel with redundant audio and climate controls, dual-zone automatic climate control, a universal garage door opener, 10-way power driver and front passenger seats, rear-seat reading lamps, and a six-speaker audio system with an AM/FM stereo radio and a six-disc, MP3-compatible CD changer. Optional in the Zephyr was a power moonroof, a DVD-based satellite navigation system, HID headlights, heated and cooled front seats, and an industry-first THX II-Certified audio system with a six-disc, MP3-compatible CD changer and ten speakers. Safety features included standard dual front-side airbags, front seat-deployed side airbags, and curtain airbags that extend from the front to rear seats.

Mechanically the Zephyr was closely related to the Fusion and Milan. As mentioned, all three cars were based on Ford's CD3 platform, which was in turn derived from the Mazda 6. Like these cars the Zephyr is natively front-wheel drive (FWD). The Zephyr uses a coil-over damper, short- and long-arm (SLA) front suspension with double-ball-joint control arms while the rear suspension is an independent multi-link design with lower control arms and a  stabilizer bar. Spring rates, bushings, and dampers have been specially tuned for the Zephyr to provide excellent ride comfort without compromising handling. All Zephyrs feature standard four-wheel anti-lock disc brakes with traction control. The sole engine offered in the Zephyr was an all-aluminum 3.0 L DOHC Duratec V6 producing 221 hp (165 kW) at 6250 rpm and 205 lb·ft (278 N·m) of torque at 4800 rpm. This engine was mated to an Aisin 6-speed automatic transmission and had a final drive ratio of 3.46:1. This powertrain was identical to the V6 powertrain available in the Fusion and Milan from 2006 to 2009.

2007 revision

For 2007, the Zephyr was refreshed and renamed MKZ to follow a new nomenclature developed by Lincoln that mimics the alphanumeric naming schemes used by other luxury automakers like Mercedes-Benz. Management at Lincoln originally announced the MKZ with a "mark-zee" pronunciation during the 2006 auto show circuit, but eventually changed it to the phonetic "em-kay-zee" due to confusion observed among focus groups and dealership personnel.

The 2007 MKZ was first shown at the Chicago Auto Show in February 2006. In addition to its new name, the MKZ gained a number of changes over its predecessor. The standard and optional versions of the MKZ's 17 x 7.5-inch wheels were restyled. An intelligent all-wheel-drive system was now available, seamlessly distributing power to each wheel for optimum traction. Powering the MKZ, and taking a large step toward further differentiating the car from the Fusion and Milan, was Ford's new, all-aluminum 3.5-L DOHC Duratec 35 V6. The engine was tuned to produce 265 hp (196 kW) at 6250 rpm and 249 lb·ft (337 N·m) of torque at 4500 rpm. Significantly, the new engine needed only 87-octane regular-grade gasoline to achieve its output. One of the few other changes applied to the 2007 MKZ was a revision to the available THX II-certified audio system to increase speakers to 14 and its peak output to 600 watts. Beyond the MKZ's changes, the car remained positioned as an entry-level luxury sedan with base models still starting at just under US$30,000 and fully optioned models remaining below $40,000.

For 2008, the MKZ received new standard features as a part of Lincoln's continued effort to refine the car. Sirius satellite radio, perforated leather seats, a reverse sensing system, a tire pressure-monitoring system, and Lincoln SYNC (late availability) were all newly standard. For 2009, Ford's 'AdvanceTrac' stability control system became standard, while a special edition "Midnight Black" package was available, featuring black leather seating surfaces and panels contrasted with maple wood and satin nickel inserts.

2010 facelift

The 2010 MKZ was unveiled at the 2008 Los Angeles International Auto Show, revealing an extensive update with a revised interior and exterior in addition to new features. The MKZ's exterior featured revised front and rear fascias. The MKZ's headlights were new, while its fascia and split-wing grille closely resembled that of the Lincoln MKR concept. In the rear, the taillights have been revised to be longer and thinner, similar to the original Zephyr concept. The MKZ's standard and optional 17-inch wheels were restyled and featured an 18-inch wheel option. Inside, the MKZ's interior was revised, using real wood accents and metal surfaces. Bridge of Weir leather seating surfaces were standard. Other features new for 2010 included a reverse camera system, Sirius Travel Link, a DVD-based satellite navigation system updated to accept voice commands, rain-sensing windshield wipers, a cabin air filter, and adaptive HID headlights. Mechanically, the MKZ featured suspension revised to improve ride quality and handling and a new 'SelectShift' six-speed automatic transmission. The 2010 MKZ was released during the spring of 2009.

MKZ Hybrid (2011)

The 2011 MKZ Hybrid was unveiled at the 2010 New York International Auto Show, and sales began in September 2010.
The MKZ Hybrid offers an improvement of Ford's Smart Gauge with EcoGuide, first introduced in the 2010 Fusion Hybrid. The MKZ Smart Gauge version offered a new "Flower" design compared to the "Leaf" design of the Fusion. In essence, the car rewards the driver with flower blossoms for economical driving/driving habits.

The Lincoln MKZ Hybrid is marketed by Ford as a competitor to the Lexus HS 250h and Lexus ES Hybrid. As of July 2011, the MKZ Hybrid was the only hybrid in the market with the same price as its conventional gasoline-engine version. Ford reported that until June 2011, about 20% of 2011 MKZ sales have been hybrids, and the market share is even higher in markets where hybrids in general sell well, such as the Los Angeles region, where sales of the hybrid model represent 44%, and the San Francisco area, with a market share of 66%.

A complete redesign of the Ford Fusion line-up was scheduled for the 2013 model year. Both the Lincoln MKZ and the Fusion Hybrid are expected to use a new compact lithium-ion battery pack and an updated powertrain that is expected to deliver a higher fuel economy up to 48 mpgUS (4.9 to 5.0 L/100 km; 56 to 58 mpgimp) highway. The next-generation Lincoln MKZ Hybrid was expected to be launched by mid-2012. The 2013 MKZ concept car was unveiled at the 2012 North American International Auto Show.

The MKZ Hybrid was one of the five finalists for the 2011 Green Car of the Year awarded by the Green Car Journal in November 2010, which was won by the Chevrolet Volt. In its 2011 Hybrid Scorecard, the Union of Concerned Scientists (UCS)  ranked the MKZ Hybrid, together with the Lexus CT200h, as the top luxury hybrid models in the scorecard's environmental improvement category, an achievement the UCS attributed to their relatively small gasoline engines. Nevertheless, the Lincoln MKZ Hybrid ranked higher than the Lexus on all factors: consumer value, hybrid technology, fuel efficiency, and pollution reduction. Also, the UCS praised the MKZ Hybrid, together with the Hyundai Sonata Hybrid, because both hybrids were available with few or no forced features that inflated the cost without adding to fuel savings or reducing emissions. The UCS's Hybrid Scorecard ratings for the MKZ Hybrid are higher than the nonluxury Toyota Prius for environmental performance, and hybrid value; both are rated the same for forced features; and the Prius scores higher in fuel economy.

Second generation (2013–2020)

Ford redesigned the Lincoln MKZ for the 2013 model year, sharing the company's CD4 platform with Fusion and Mondeo. The concept model debuted at the 2012 North American International Auto Show. The production version of the second-generation MKZ was unveiled at the 2012 New York Auto Show. It followed the general concept idea released in the model displayed at the 2012 Detroit Auto Show.

The MKZ was originally set to be released in November 2012, but this was set back to January after Fusion production was delayed, which is produced at the same plant.  Its release date was again pushed back after Ford looked to iron out any possible quality issues.  Some MKZs were even shipped from the Mexican facility to Ford's Flat Rock plant to be reassured and inspected that they were ready to be sent to dealerships. This was an unprecedented move for such a big product launch, but Ford felt it would be profitable in the long run.  Cars finally started to reach dealerships in sufficient quantities by mid-March 2013.

Ford offered the 2013 MKZ with three powertrains: a 240-horsepower EcoBoost 2-liter four-cylinder (FWD or AWD), a 300-horsepower 3.7-liter V6 (FWD or AWD), and a hybrid system based on the 2-liter power plant. The hybrid, like the previous-generation MKZ Hybrid, was available for the same price as the non-hybrid model.

Given the model's significant redesign for 2013, changes to the 2014 MKZ were primarily limited to color choices.  For 2015, automatic headlights, rear parking sensors and rear view camera became standard.

EPA ratings

These ratings allowed the 2013 MKZ Hybrid to become the most fuel-efficient luxury vehicle in the U.S. and improve the fuel economy of the Lexus ES 300h hybrid by 5 mpg-US on the combined cycle.

2017 facelift

The MKZ received a facelift for the 2017 model year. Revealed on November 18, 2015, at the LA Auto Show, the MKZ is the first to adopt Lincoln's new design language previewed earlier on the Lincoln Continental concept car, featuring redesigned front grille and headlights. The 3.7 L V6 will be dropped in favor of an all-new 3.0 L twin-turbo V6 engine unique to Lincoln, producing between 350 and 400 horsepower depending on the drive-train. Trim levels include the standard model, plus Premiere, Select, Reserve and top level Black Label, which is three special appearance packages, a tradition started with the Designer Editions in 1976. The MKZ offers the "Vineyard" (unique to the MKZ), "Chalet", and "Thoroughbred" theme appearance packages. In continuing with Lincoln tradition, Bridge of Weir "Deepsoft" leather is used for the Select and Reserve trim packages.

The transmission is no longer activated with a center console installed transmission selector; the computer controlled transmission uses buttons installed to the left of the MyLincoln Touch infotainment touch screen labeled "P, R, N, D, S", a revival of an approach used in the 1950s by the Chrysler push button PowerFlite and the Packard Touchbutton Ultramatic. The "S" transmission selection represents "Sport" mode, where the Continuously Controlled Damping suspension, electric power steering and transmission shift points take on a different posture.

The MKZ received no more major changes, with the new model years bringing new colors and a gradual diminishing of the lineup. For 2020, the car's final year on the market, only the Base and Reserve trims remained, with either Hybrid, Turbo, or V6 powertrains.

Sales

See also
 Lincoln-Zephyr
 Mercury Zephyr

References

External links

Official Lincoln MKZ Page

All-wheel-drive vehicles
Ford CD3 platform
Front-wheel-drive vehicles
MKZ
2010s cars
Cars introduced in 2005
Hybrid electric cars
Ford CD4 platform